

Events
February – The Juilliard String Quartet receives the NARAS Lifetime Achievement Award for its outstanding contributions to recorded classical music.
May 12 – The Classical Brit Awards are presented by Myleene Klass at London's Royal Albert Hall.

New works
Kalevi Aho – Trumpet Concerto
Elliott Carter – Two Controversies and a Conversation
Julius Dobos – Hymn to The Fukushima 50
Francesco Filidei – Ballata, for organ, ensemble and live electronics
Philip Glass – Symphony No. 9
Mehdi Hosseini – Monodies
Iamus (computer) – Hello World!
Wojciech Kilar –
Lumen for mixed a cappella choir
Piano Concerto No. 2
Paul Mealor – Ubi Caritas et Amor
Per Nørgård – Symphony No. 8
Christopher Rouse
Prospero's Rooms
Symphony No. 3
Steven Stucky – Silent Spring

Opera premieres

Albums
Nicola Benedetti – Italia
Andrea Bocelli – Concerto: One Night in Central Park
Joseph Calleja – The Maltese Tenor
Jackie Evancho – Dream With Me
Wynne Evans – A Song In My Heart
Angela Gheorghiu – Homage to Maria Callas
Katherine Jenkins – Daydream
Miloš Karadaglić – The Guitar
 Oregon Symphony – Music for a Time of War
André Rieu & the Johann Strauss Orchestra – Moonlight Serenade

Musical films
Violin

Deaths
January 24 – Bhimsen Joshi, Indian classical vocalist, 88
January 28 – Dame Margaret Price, Welsh operatic soprano, 69
February 2 – Armando Chin Yong, 52, Malaysian opera singer
February 5 – Beatrice Krebs, 86, American mezzo-soprano
February 6 – Per Grundén, 88, Swedish tenor
February 10 – Claus Helmut Drese, 88, German opera manager
February 21 – Antonín Švorc, 77, Czech bass-baritone
February 26 – Eugene Fodor, US violinist, 60
March 13 – , 81, Austrian baritone
March 22 – Victor Bouchard, Canadian pianist and composer, 84
March 28 – Lee Hoiby, 85, American composer and pianist
March 29 – Robert Tear, Welsh operatic tenor and conductor, 72
April 8 – Donald Shanks, 70, Australian bass-baritone
April 8 – Daniel Catán, 62, Mexican composer
April 15 – Vincenzo La Scola, Italian operatic tenor, 53 (heart attack)
May 7 – Jane Rhodes, 82, French soprano/mezzo-soprano
May 30 – Giorgio Tozzi, 88, American bass
July 4 – Gerhard Unger, 95, German tenor
July 6 – Josef Suk, Czech violinist and conductor, 81
July 23 – David Aiken, 93, American baritone
July 26 – Denise Scharley, French operatic contralto, 94
August 1 – Milada Šubrtová, Czech operatic soprano, 87
August 2 – Ralph Berkowitz, US composer and painter, 100
August 3 – Louise Behrend, US violinist and academic, 94
August 25 – Anne Sharp, 94, Scottish coloratura soprano
September 5 – Salvatore Licitra, 43, Italian tenor
September 29 – Vera Veljkov-Medaković, Serbian pianist and piano teacher, 88
October 8 – Ingvar Wixell, Swedish operatic baritone, 80
October 19 – James Yannatos, US composer conductor, violinist and teacher, 82
October 29 – Walter Norris, American pianist and composer, 79
November 22 – Sena Jurinac, Bosnian operatic soprano, 90
November 23 – Montserrat Figueras, Catalan operatic soprano, 70
December 5 – Violetta Villas, Polish coloratura soprano, cabaret star, singer, actress, composer and songwriter, 73
December 8 – Minoru Miki, 81, Japanese composer

Major awards

International Tchaikovsky Competition 2011 – Piano
Daniil Trifonov

International Tchaikovsky Competition 2011 – Violin
No first prize awarded. Sergey Dogadin and Itamar Zorman share second prize.

2011 International Franz Liszt Piano Competition
Masataka Goto

BBC Cardiff Singer of the World competition
Valentina Naforniţă

Classical Brits
Composer of the Year – Arvo Pärt
Male Artist of the Year – Antonio Pappano
Female Artist Of The Year – Alison Balsom
Critics' Award – Tasmin Little
Artist of the Decade – Il Divo

Grammy Awards
See 53rd Grammy Awards

See also
 2011 in opera

References

Clssical
Classical music by year